Mummenhoffia is a genus of flowering plants belonging to the family Brassicaceae.

Its native range is Europe to Turkey, Ethiopia to Tanzania. It is found in Albania, Austria, Bulgaria, Ethiopia, France, Germany, Greece, Hungary, Italy, Kenya, Romania, Sicily, Spain, Tanzania, Turkey, Ukraine and Yugoslavia.

The genus name of Grovesia is in honour of Klaus Mummenhoff (b.1956), a German botanist, specialist in Brassicaceae and Professor at the Osnabrück University.

The genus was circumscribed by Shokou Esmailbegi and Ihsan Ali Al-Shehbaz in Taxon vol.67 (Issue 2) on page 334 in 2018.

Species:
Mummenhoffia alliacea 
Mummenhoffia oliveri

References

Brassicaceae
Brassicaceae genera